WWMR (102.9 FM) is a radio station licensed to Saltillo, Mississippi and serving the Tupelo, Mississippi area. The station is owned by Flinn Broadcasting.

History
The station was granted the WWMR calls on September 5, 2006. On August 27, 2008, WWMR signed on the air with a talk format as part of the Supertalk Mississippi talk radio network. On September 3, 2016, WWMR changed its format from talk to country, branded as "Outlaw 102.9". On December 25, 2017, WWMR changed its format from country to Top 40/CHR, branded as "Wild 102.9". On May 1, 2018, WWMR changed their format to Southern Gospel and branding themselves as 102.9 The Eagle. 

On November 25, 2022, WWMR began stunting with Christmas music, branded as "Christmas 102.9", and a new format was expected to launch after the holiday season.

Previous logo

References

External links

WMR
Radio stations established in 2008
2008 establishments in Mississippi